|}

The Sporting Limerick 4yo Hurdle is a Grade 2 National Hunt novice hurdle race in Ireland which is open to horses aged four years. 
It is run at Limerick over a distance of 2 miles (3,218 metres), and it is scheduled to take place each year at the Christmas Festival.

The race was first run in 2001 as a valuable Conditions race.  It was awarded Listed status in 2014, raised to Grade 3 in 2017 and has been a Grade 2 event since 2020.

Winners

See also
 Horse racing in Ireland
 List of Irish National Hunt races

References 
Racing Post: 
 , 

National Hunt races in Ireland
National Hunt hurdle races
Limerick Racecourse